Polyhalogen ions are a group of polyatomic cations and anions containing halogens only. The ions can be classified into two classes, isopolyhalogen ions which contain one type of halogen only, and heteropolyhalogen ions with more than one type of halogen.

Introduction

Numerous polyhalogen ions have been found, with their salts isolated in the solid state and structurally characterized. The following tables summarize the known species.

Free  is only known from its electronic band spectrum obtained in a low-pressure discharge tube.

Structure

Most of the structures of the ions have been determined by IR spectroscopy, Raman spectroscopy and X-ray crystallography. The polyhalogen ions always have the heaviest and least electronegative halogen present in the ion as the central atom, making the ion asymmetric in some cases. For example,  has a structure of  but not .

In general, the structures of most heteropolyhalogen ions and lower isopolyhalogen ions were in agreement with the VSEPR model. However, there were exceptional cases. More deviations from the ideal VSEPR model were found in the solid state structures due to strong cation-anion interactions, which also complicates interpretation of vibrational spectroscopic data. In all known structures of the polyhalogen anion salts, the anions make very close contact, via halogen bridges, with the counter-cations. For example, in the solid state,  is not regularly octahedral, as solid state structure of  reveals loosely bound  dimers.

  is one of the two -type species known to have the rare pentagonal planar geometry, the other being .

  is distorted octahedral as the stereochemical inert pair effect is not significant in the chlorine atom.

Higher polyiodides

The polyiodide ions have much more complicated structures. In the solid states, the polyiodides can interact with each other to form chains, rings, or even complicated two-dimensional and three-dimensional networks.

Bonding

The bonding in polyhalogen ions mostly invoke the predominant use of p-orbitals. Significant d-orbital participation in the bonding is improbable as much promotional energy will be required, while scant s-orbital participation is expected in iodine-containing species due to the inert pair effect, suggested by data from Mössbauer spectroscopy. However, no bonding model has been capable of reproducing such wide range of bond lengths and angles observed so far.

Linear or nearly-linear triatomic polyhalides have weaker and longer bonds compared with that in the corresponding diatomic interhalogen or halogen, consistent with the additional repulsion between atoms as the halide ion is added to the neutral molecule. Another model involving the use of resonance theory exists, for example,  can be viewed as the resonance hybrid of the following canonical forms:

Other triatomic species  can be similarly interpreted.

Even though they have a reduced bond order, all three halogen atoms are tightly bound. The fluorine–fluorine bond of trifluoride, with bond order 0.5, has a bond-strength is 30 kcal/mol, only 8 kcal/mol less than the fluorine–fluorine bond in difluorine whose bond order is 1.

Synthesis

The formation of polyhalogen ions can be viewed as the self-dissociation of their parent interhalogens or halogens:

Polyhalogen cations

There are two general strategies for preparing polyhalogen cations:
By reacting the appropriate interhalogen with a Lewis acid (such as the halides of B, Al, P, As, Sb) either in an inert or oxidizing solvent (such as anhydrous HF) or without one, to give a heteropolyhalogen cation.
 
By an oxidative process, in which the halogen or interhalogen is reacted with an oxidizer and a Lewis acid to give the cation:

In some cases the Lewis acid (the fluoride acceptor) itself acts as an oxidant:

Usually the first method is employed for preparing heteropolyhalogen cations, and the second one is applicable to both. The oxidative process is useful in the preparation of the cations , as their parent interhalogens,  respectively, has never been isolated:

The preparation of some individual species are briefly summarized in the table below with equations:

Polyhalogen anions

For polyhalogen anions, there are two general preparation strategies as well:
By reacting an interhalogen or halogen with a Lewis base, most likely a fluoride:

By oxidation of simple halides:

The preparation of some individual species are briefly summarized in the table below with equations:

Properties

Stability

The polyhalogen cations are strong oxidizing agents, as indicated by the fact that they can only be prepared in oxidative liquids as a solvent, such as oleum.

The stability of the  salts (X = Br, I) are thermodynamically quite stable. However, their stability in solution depends on the superacid solvent.

For polyhalogen anions with the same cation, the more stable ones are those with a heavier halogen at the center, symmetric ions are also more stable than asymmetric ones. therefore the stability of the anions decrease in the order:

Heteropolyhalogen ions with a coordination number larger than or equal to four can only exist with fluoride ligands.

Color

Most polyhalogen ions are intensely colored, with deepened color as the atomic weight of the constituent element increases. The well-known starch-iodine complex has a deep blue color due to the linear  ions present in the amylose helix. Some colors of the common species were listed below:
 fluorocations tend to be colorless or pale yellow, other heteropolyhalogen ions are orange, red or deep purple
  is yellow
  is blue
  is cherry red
  is brown
  is dark brown
  is bright blue
  is dark brown to black
  is red to brown
  is green or black, the salt  exists as greenish-black needles, but appears brown-red in thin sections
  is black, if its existence in the compound  has been firmly established
  is black
  is scarlet red
  is golden-yellow
 polyiodides have very dark colors, either dark brown or dark blue

Chemical properties

The heteropolyhalogen cations are explosively reactive oxidants, and the cations often have higher reactivity than their parent interhalogens and decompose by reductive pathways.

Polyhalogen cations with lower oxidation states tend to disproportionate. For example,  is unstable in solution and disproportionate completely in HF/ mixture even at 197 K:

 reversibly dimerizes at 193 K, and is observed as the blue color of paramagnetic  dramatically shifts to the red-brown color of diamagnetic , together with a drop in paramagnetic susceptibility and electrical conductivity when the solution is cooled to below 193 K:

The dimerization can be attributed to the overlapping of the half-filled π* orbitals in two .

The anions are less reactive compared to the cations, and are generally weaker oxidants than their parent interhalogens. They are less reactive towards organic compounds, and some salts are of quite high thermal stability. An interhalogen is usually formed as the other product.

See also
 Polyiodide
 Halogen bond
 Inorganic polymer
 Catenation
 Allotropy

References

Halogens